Tetrachlorocatechol is an organochlorine compound with the formula .  It is a white solid.  It results from the degradation of the controversial pesticide pentachlorophenol.  It is a precursor to the reagent TRISPHAT. Its conjugate base also functions as a ligand for transition metals.

References

Chloroarenes
Catechols